Bert Monroy is an American artist best known as an early Photoshop expert. He wrote the first book on the use of Photoshop (The Official Adobe Photoshop Handbook, coauthored with David Biedny), and became an established Photoshop educator. He was a frequent guest on The Screen Savers, where he gave brief Photoshop tutorials. In 2004 he was inducted into the Photoshop Hall of Fame. He also hosted a web TV show, PixelPerfect, on Revision3. Monroy is currently a regular teacher on the training website Lynda.com and hosts an ongoing series called Pixel Playground which is similar to Pixel Perfect.

References

External links
Pixel Perfect
Bert Monroy's website
Photoshop Hall of Fame

American digital artists
Living people
Revision3
Year of birth missing (living people)